The Jasper String Quartet is a professional string quartet based in Philadelphia, Pennsylvania. Currently the Ensemble in Residence at Temple University's Center for Gifted Young Musicians, the quartet was previously the Quartet in Residence at Oberlin Conservatory (from 2010–2012). Formed in 2004 while its members were in school at Oberlin Conservatory, the quartet completed string quartet master's programs at Rice University (2006–2008) and Yale University (2008–2010). The group's primary mentors are James Dunham, Norman Fischer and the Tokyo String Quartet. In 2010, they joined the roster of Astral Artists.

The Jasper String Quartet received Chamber Music America's prestigious Cleveland Quartet Award in 2012. In 2015, they commissioned and performed the premiere of Aaron Jay Kernis' 3rd String Quartet "River". The piece was commissioned for the quartet by a consortium of presenters including the Caramoor Center for Music and the Arts, Chamber Music Northwest, Chamber Music Monterey Bay, Carnegie Hall, Classic Chamber Concerts of Naples, FL and Wigmore Hall. Funding was also provided by the Chamber Music America Classical Commissioning Program, with generous funding provided by The Andrew W. Mellon Foundation, and the Chamber Music America Endowment Fund.

The Jasper String Quartet records for the Sono Luminus Label.

Members 
J Freivogel, violin

Karen Kim, violin

Andrew Gonzalez, viola

Rachel Henderson Freivogel, cello

Awards and recognition 
 2017 – Record album "Unbound" named as one of the New York Times top 25 Classical Music Recordings of 2017
 2014 – Chamber Music America's Classical Commissioning Grant Recipient
 2012 – Cleveland Quartet Award
 2012 – Chamber Music America's Residency Partnership Program Grant Recipient – in partnership with Astral Artists
 2010–2012 – String Quartet in Residence at Oberlin Conservatory
 2010 – Yale School of Music’s Horatio Parker Memorial Prize
 2009–2011 – Caramoor Center's Ernst Stiefel String Quartet in Residence
 2008 and 2009 – Silver Medal at the Fischoff Chamber Music Competition
 2008 – Grand Prize and the Audience Prize in the Plowman Chamber Music Competition
 2008 – Grand Prize at the Coleman Competition
 2008 – First Prize at Chamber Music Yellow Springs

Recordings 
 The Kernis Project: Beethoven – Beethoven Op. 59 No. 3, Kernis Quartet No. 2 "musica instrumentalis" (2011)
 The Kernis Project: Schubert – Schubert D. 810 "Death and the Maiden", Kernis Quartet No. 1 "musica celestis" (2012)
 Beethoven Op. 131 (2014, digital only release)
 Unbound – "Valencia" by Caroline Shaw, "Death Valley Junction" by Missy Mazzoli, "The Blue Horse Walks on the Horizon" by Annie Gosfield, "Four on the Floor" by Judd Greenstein, "almost all the time" David Lang, "Pushpulling" by Donnacha Dennehy, "Excerpts from the middle of something" by Ted Hearne

References

External links 
 Jasper String Quartet – official site
 Dispeker Artists 
 Astral Artists

American string quartets